Tuy Hòa station is one of the main railway stations on the North–South railway (Reunification Express) in Vietnam. It serves the city of Tuy Hòa, the capital city of Phú Yên Province in south-central Vietnam.

Tuy Hoa
Railway stations in Vietnam
Buildings and structures in Phú Yên province